Kumgang Airport(금강비행장) is an airport in Kangwon-do, North Korea.

Facilities 
The airfield has a single grass runway 01/19 measuring 1500 x 62 feet (457 x 19 m).

References 

Airports in North Korea